Purathakudi  is a village in the Indian Tamil Nadu and Tiruchirappalli district. Purathakudi is situated 18 kilometers away from Tiruchirappalli. Main occupation of the people of Purathakudi is agriculture. There is a famous school " St. Xavier's Higher Secondary School. It has a 325-year-old St. Xavier church and Purathakudi AG Church which is about 40 years old. near the Mahilambadi, Neikkuppai and Pudur uthamanur village. Dharmanathapuram is just 4 km from Purathakudi.

Villages in Tiruchirappalli district